Dantrell Savage (born February 15, 1985 in Columbus, Georgia) is a former American football running back who played for the Kansas City Chiefs of the National Football League. He was signed by the Kansas City Chiefs as an undrafted free agent in 2008. He played college football at Oklahoma State.

Professional career

Kansas City Chiefs
Savage was signed to a two-year contract by the Kansas City Chiefs as an undrafted free agent following the 2008 NFL Draft on May 20, 2008. He was placed on injured reserve due to an ankle injury on December 19, 2009. He was released by the Chiefs on March 3, 2010.

Carolina Panthers
Savage signed with the Carolina Panthers on August 2, 2010.  He was released on September 4, 2013

References

External links
Kansas City Chiefs bio
Oklahoma State Cowboys football bio

1985 births
Living people
Players of American football from Columbus, Georgia
American football running backs
Oklahoma State Cowboys football players
Kansas City Chiefs players
Carolina Panthers players
Mississippi Gulf Coast Bulldogs football players